Abington may refer to:

People
Abington (surname)

Places

Ireland
Abington, County Limerick, part of a civil parish in Ireland which straddles two counties, Limerick and Tipperary
Abington (townland), a townland in the above civil parish in County Limerick
Abington, County Tipperary, part of a civil parish in Ireland which straddles two counties, Limerick and Tipperary

United Kingdom
Abington, Cambridgeshire, England
Abington, Northamptonshire, England, a former village merged into Northampton
Abington (ward), an electoral ward of Northampton, England
Abington, South Lanarkshire, Scotland

United States
Abington, Connecticut
Abington, Indiana
Abington, Massachusetts
Abington Township, Mercer County, Illinois
Abington Township, Wayne County, Indiana
Waverly Township, Lackawanna County, Pennsylvania (formerly Abington Township)
Abington Township, Montgomery County, Pennsylvania

Other uses
Pinta Island, also known as Abington Island, located in the Galápagos Islands group
Abington (MBTA station)

See also
Abingdon (disambiguation)